Elections to Adur District Council were held on 1 May 2003. One third of the council was up for election and the Conservative Party held overall control of the council. Overall turnout was 31.7%.

After the election, the composition of the council was:
Conservative 27
Labour 8
Independent 4

Results

Ward results

References
BBC report of 2003 Adur election result

2003
2003 English local elections
2000s in West Sussex